The Women's 44 kg powerlifting event at the 2004 Summer Paralympics was competed  on 20 September. It was won by Lucy Ejike, representing .

Final round

20 Sept. 2004, 17:15

References

W
Para